Michael Thomas Campbell (born February 17, 1964) is a former Major League Baseball pitcher. He was picked in the first round (7th overall) by the Seattle Mariners in the 1985 Major League Baseball Draft, out of the University of Hawaii. He attended West Seattle High School and Newport High School in Bellevue Wa. Campbell was named Pacific Coast League Most Valuable Player in 1987 while coming up through the Mariners system with the Calgary Cannons before his MLB debut that same year. 

After making his major league debut on July 4, 1987, Campbell was in and out of the Mariners rotation from 1987 to 1989. During the 1989 season he was traded to the Montreal Expos along with Mark Langston in a 5 player deal in which the Mariners received Randy Johnson, Brian Holman and Gene Harris. Campbell also played in the big leagues with the Texas Rangers, San Diego Padres and Chicago Cubs.

Chronic shoulder injuries slowly forced him out of the game. He played for the Yokohama BayStars in 1997 but had his season cut short by a serious ankle injury that required reconstructive surgery. He retired permanently from baseball in 1999 after a stint in the independent Atlantic League.

External links

1964 births
Living people
Baseball players from Washington (state)
Major League Baseball pitchers
Seattle Mariners players
Texas Rangers players
San Diego Padres players
Chicago Cubs players
Indianapolis Indians players
Hawaii Rainbow Warriors baseball players
American expatriate baseball players in Japan
Lehigh Valley Black Diamonds players
Tri-City Posse players
Grays Harbor Gulls players
Pacific Coast League MVP award winners
Anchorage Bucs players
American expatriate baseball players in Canada
Calgary Cannons players
Chattanooga Lookouts players
Iowa Cubs players
Las Vegas Stars (baseball) players
Oklahoma City 89ers players
Rancho Cucamonga Quakes players
Salinas Spurs players
Tulsa Drillers players
Vancouver Canadians players
Alaska Goldpanners of Fairbanks players